Gerwin van der Werf (born June 13, 1969 in De Meern) is a Dutch author of novels, songwriter and instrumentalist. In April 2010 his first novel, 'de Gewapende Man,' was published by Uitgeverij Contact. In January 2010, his poem 'Misbruik' won the first prize in the Dutch Turing National Poetry Contest, a prestigious Dutch poetry contest.

Gerwin van der Werf plays in the Dutch band 'The New Beetles', and has composed several songs.

Early life and education
Gerwin van der Werf was born in De Meern and raised in Elburg, Netherlands, the youngest of two children.

He studied musicology at the University of Utrecht and earned his doctoral in 1994.

Career

 2012 Longlist nomination for the prestigious Dutch 'Libris Literatuurprijs'
 2011 Novel 'Wild', publisher contact
 2010 First prize Dutch Turing National Poetry Contest
 2010 Novel 'De Gewapende Man, Contact'
 2009 Tweede Prijs Zomerverhalen Schrijven Magazine
 2008 Nomination '1000 woorden prijs'
 2008 Third prize Dutch Paper Trouw writing competition 'Mijn betere ik’
 2008 First prize Volkskrant writing competition "Vakantiegeluk”
 2008 'Met woorden kan ik toveren' publicized in 'Mijn tweede Van Dale Luisterwoordenboek'
 2008 First prize Trouw Schrijfwedstrijd "Een bekentenis”
 2008 Pika Don, new musical production (RLO)
 2006 Author 'Intro Muziek voor de Bovenbouw' (ThiemeMeulenhoff)
 1998–2007 Macbeth, Oedipus, West Side Story & 6 andere theaterproducties (RLO)
 1998 Antigone (Theater Imperium)
 1997 Hamlet (RLO)
 1996 Ten pieces for "New Belcanto", Dordrecht
 1995 Belcanto Festival, opera pastiche (script, arrangements)
 1994 Doctoral musicology Utrecht
 1992 Composition-prize musicology

References

External links
[van der Werf, Gerwin. "My homepage"

1969 births
Living people
Dutch novelists
Dutch poets
People from Vleuten-De Meern
Utrecht University alumni